James Clapperton (born 1968 in Aberdeen) is a Scottish composer and pianist.

In 1984 he performed an arrangement of Stravinsky's 'Rite of Spring' made by himself and David Horne for piano duet at the Dartington Summer School. Witold Lutoslawski, Michael Tippett and Harrison Birtwistle were in attendance. In 1988 he was awarded the Kranichsteiner Musikpreis at the Darmstadt Ferienkurse fur Neue Musik. Since then he has worked with many of the world's leading composers. In 1991 he gave the world premiere of Europera 3 by John Cage and toured in London, Strasbourg, Berlin and Paris with the composer. At this time he performed regularly as a piano duo with his former tutor Yvar Mikhashoff.

Clapperton has given recitals at major festivals throughout Europe and in North America. In 2003 he gave the Russian premiere of the complete Ligeti Etudes at the St. Petersburg Soundways festival. From 1998 to 2002 he was the artistic director of the Music Factory Festival in Bergen, Norway. He featured the music of Sciarrino, Lachenmann and Radulescu among others. James Clapperton enjoyed a collaboration with the Romanian master Horațiu Rădulescu which lasted twenty years until he died in 2008. He has also worked closely with composers such as Brian Ferneyhough, Alexander Radvilovitch, Salvatore Sciarrino, Howard Skempton and many others.

References

1968 births
20th-century classical composers
21st-century classical composers
Classical piano duos
Living people
People from Aberdeen
Scottish classical composers
British male classical composers
Scottish classical pianists
Male classical pianists
20th-century Scottish musicians
20th-century British composers
British male pianists
21st-century classical pianists
20th-century British male musicians
21st-century British male musicians